Henry Barker may refer to:

Henry Barker (athlete), British Olympic athlete
Henry Alfred Barker (1858–1940), English socialist activist
Henry Aston Barker (1774–1856), Scottish artist
Henry Raine Barker (1829–1902), English lawyer, banker and rower
Henry Stites Barker (1850–1928), American university administrator, lawyer and judge
Henry Rodman Barker (1841–1901), mayor of Providence, Rhode Island
Henry Barker (canon) (1657–1740), Canon of Westminster
H. W. Barker (1860–1950), American politician

See also
Edmund Henry Barker (1788–1839), English classical scholar

Harry Barker (disambiguation)